Bharat Forge Co Ltd v Uttam Manohar Nakate [2005] INSC 45 is an Indian labour law case concerning the dismissal of a worker who was found to be asleep in 1983. After 22 years, the Supreme Court of India upheld his dismissal.

Facts
Uttam was a helper in Bharat Forge. He was found lying fast asleep on an iron plate in the corner of the department at 11:40 a.m. on 26 August 1983. This was the fourth time this had happened, After five-month-long disciplinary hearings, the company fired him in January 1984. Uttam went to court, which found the company guilty of "unfair labour practice" and forced the factory to take Uttam back and pay him 50 percent of his lost wages. The case was appealed to the Bombay High Court and eventually to the national Supreme Court of India, reported as AIR 2005 SC 947.

Judgment
In 2005 the Supreme Court came to the conclusion that the company had the right to fire him.

Significance
Nakate's case is often used as an example of the problems with Indian labour law system of requiring government approval before dismissals can take effect.

See also
Indian labour law
UK labour law
Unfair dismissal

Notes

Labour relations in India
Indian case law
Indian labour law
Indian labour case law
Labour law